Haven't Got the Blues (Yet) is the twenty-third studio album by American singer-songwriter Loudon Wainwright III. It was released on July 28, 2014 on Proper Records.

David Mansfield, who has been one of Wainwright's regular collaborators, produced the album.  Wainwright has said of Mansfield: "I got to know L'il Davey about twenty-three years ago, on a flight back from Vancouver - I think - to New York. I've worked on and off with him ever since, on TV, in the recording studio, and on the road. He's been featured as a player and arranger on some of my best records, including History (1992), Grown Man (1995), Last Man on Earth (2001), and High Wide & Handsome (2009)."

All songs on Haven't Got the Blues (Yet) were written and composed by Loudon Wainwright III, except for "Harmless", which is by Michael Marra.

Dom Flemons played harmonica and jug on the album.

Track listing

References

2014 albums
Loudon Wainwright III albums
Proper Records albums